Buckeye Lake is a high-elevation lake in the Rogue–Umpqua Divide Wilderness in southern Oregon in the United States.

The lake is reachable by forest trail. Ice fishing here is possible in February and March for hikers willing to approach the lake by snowshoe.

See also 
 List of lakes in Oregon

References

Lakes of Oregon
Lakes of Douglas County, Oregon